was an anti-submarine warfare naval trawler of the Royal Navy during the Second World War. She spent the war escorting convoys in the Atlantic and Arctic, including the famous convoy JW 51B.

Service history 
Vizalma was ordered from Cook, Welton & Gemmell of Beverley by the Atlas Steam Fishing Company of Grimsby and launched on 11 April 1940. However, before she was completed, on 15 June 1940, she was requisitioned by the Admiralty and completed as an anti-submarine trawler on 12 August 1940. She was assigned to the Royal Naval Patrol Service and employed as a convoy escort.

Initially Vizalma was assigned to the Londonderry Escort Groups based in Derry, Northern Ireland, providing local escorts for Atlantic convoys entering and leaving the Western Approaches interspersed with trips to Gibraltar and Iceland. She was later transferred to the Iceland Command for duties on the Russian convoys escorting merchant ships from Scotland to the Kola Inlet via Iceland.  She made two return trips to Murmansk. 

The second outgoing convoy, in December 1942, was JW 51B, which was involved in the engagement that became known as the Battle of the Barents Sea. However, Vizalma had become separated from the convoy during a gale and was escorting merchantman Chester Valley away from the main group when the battle erupted. They went north to avoid the action and rejoined the convoy two days later. However not directly involved in the battle she played a role in it : when the covering cruiser force of the convoy was racing towards the convoy in response to reports of an attacking German force, the force detected the 2 ships Vizalma and Chester Valley on their radar. They had to investigate and lost precious time whilst the German force was attacking the convoy escorts.

After returning from Russia, Vizalma resumed Atlantic convoy escort duties and, from September to November 1943, guard ship duties in the Faroes and Azores. On 23 December 1945 she was sold back to her original owners and converted into a deep-sea trawler. She was scrapped at Dunston from 4 November 1964.

Convoys escorted by Vizalma

Notes and references

Sources 

 
 
 
 
 
 
 
 
 

Anti-submarine trawlers of the Royal Navy
Naval trawlers of the United Kingdom
Trawlers
1940 ships